The eighth season of the Indian Kannada-language reality television game show Bigg Boss premiered on 28 February 2021. It is produced by Endemol Shine India under the control of Banijay and broadcast on Colors Kannada with Kiccha Sudeepa as the host.

The season was suspended on 8 May 2021, due to the COVID-19 pandemic. The last episode was aired after a show run for 71 days and later it continued from 23 June 2021 onwards.

Housemate Status

Second Innings

Bigg Boss Second Innings is continuation of Bigg Boss 8 Kannada , since the show was suspended due to the COVID-19 pandemic on day 71 and the day 72 resumed from 23 June 2021 onwards with a new title called Bigg Boss Second Innings and twelve non evicted contestants have entered the house to compete till the finale of the 8th season.

Housemate Status

Telecast
Bigg Boss Kannada Season 8 is telecasted everyday on Colors Kannada. 
On the digital platform, Voot owns the show. It contains:

 Main Episode (The main episode that is telecasted on Colors Kannada)
TV Ginta Modalu (Main Episode telecast before the airing on TV, only on Voot Select)
24/7 Live Channel (Live telecast from Bigg Boss house, on weekdays, only on Voot Select)
Unseen Kathegalu (Unseen Clips, only on Voot Select)
Extra Masala (Extra Clips)
Bigg Inn (Entry Interview)
Bigg Bang (Exit Interview)
Voot Weekly (Best Compilations)
Voot Fryday (Special Friday Tasks)
Voot Video Vichara (Audience can share their views about the contestants through a video)
Voting

The show is most viewed on the digital platform rather than the TV platform which includes double viewership than that of the TV platform.

Production

Delay
The show was going on air from October, but the eight season get delayed due to the COVID-19 pandemic and on 15 February 2021 the channel confirmed that the show is going to launch on 28 February 2021.

House
The Bigg Boss house is built in Innovative Film City at Bidadi, Bengaluru. While the show is returning to Kannada television after a gap of an year, new norms and changes have been taken as part of safety precautions due to the ongoing COVID-19 pandemic.

Contestants
The show is sticking to the original format of the reality programme and it will only have celebrities who will be entering the house as contestants due to it is taking place amidst the COVID-19 pandemic, the makers have taken all necessary precautions to ensure a COVID-free environment for everyone involved in the production.

Format
The show follows selected contestants who are isolated from the outside world for 106 days (or 15 weeks) in a custom-built house. The housemates are dictated by an omnipresent entity named Bigg Boss. Each week, one or more of the housemates are evicted by a public vote. The last week, the housemate who gets the most votes, wins the game.

Housemates
The participants of Bigg Boss Kannada Season 8 are as follows:

 Dhanushree – Social media personality
 Shubha Poonja – Film Actress
 Shankar Ashwath – Veteran Actor
 Vishwanath Haveri – Singer
 Vaishnavi Gowda – Serial Actress
 Aravind KP – Motorcyclist
 Nidhi Subbaiah – Film  Actress
 Shamanth  Gowda – Social media personality
 Geetha Bharathi Bhat – Serial actress
 Manju Pavagada – Comedian
 Nirmala Chennappa – Actress & Director
 Raghu Gowda – Youtuber
 Divya Suresh – Actress and Model 
 Divya Uruduga  – Actress
 Chandrakala Mohan – Serial Actress
 Prashanth Sambargi – Businessman & Activist

Rajeev Hanu – Actor & Cricketer

Wildcard entrants
 Chakravarthy Chandrachud - Journalist, Writer and Director
 Vyjayanthi Adiga  - Actress
Priyanka Thimmesh - Film actress

Nomination table

References

Television productions suspended due to the COVID-19 pandemic
Colors Kannada original programming
Kannada-language television shows
Bigg Boss Kannada